Gunard Hjertstedt (March 28, 1904 - January 9, 1969), better known by pen name Day Keene, was an American novelist, short story writer and radio and television scriptwriter. Keene wrote over 50 novels and was the head writer for radio soap operas Little Orphan Annie and Kitty Keene, Inc. Several of his novels were adapted into movies, including Joy House (MGM, 1964) and Chautauqua, released as The Trouble with Girls (MGM, 1969).

Bibliography

Novels
 Framed in Guilt (aka Evidence Most Blind), 1949
 Farewell to Passion (aka The Passion Murders), 1951
 My Flesh Is Sweet, 1951
 Love Me and Die, 1951
 To Kiss or Kill, 1951
 Hunt the Killer, 1952
 About Doctor Ferrel, 1952
 Home Is the Sailor, 1952
 If the Coffin Fits, 1952
 Naked Fury, 1952
 Wake Up to Murder, 1952
 Mrs. Homicide, 1953
 Strange Witness, 1953
 The Big Kiss-Off, 1954
 There Was A Crooked Man, 1954
 Death House Doll, 1954
 His Father's Wife, 1954
 Homicidal Lady, 1954
 Joy House, 1954
 Notorious, 1954
 Sleep with the Devil, 1954
 Who Has Wilma Lathrop?, 1955
 The Dangling Carrot, 1955
 Murder on the Side, 1956
 Bring Him Back Dead, 1956
 It's a Sin to Kill, 1958
 Passage to Samoa, 1958
 Dead Dolls Don't Talk, 1959
 Dead in Bed, 1959
 Moran's Woman, 1959
 Miami 59, 1959
 So Dead My Lovely, 1959
 Take a Step to Murder, 1959
 Too Black for Heaven, 1959
 Too Hot to Hold, 1959
 The Brimstone Bed, 1960
 Chautauqua, 1960
 Payola, 1960
 World Without Women (with Leonard Pruyn), 1960
 Seed of Doubt, 1961
 Bye, Baby Bunting, 1963
 LA 46, 1964
 Carnival of Death, 1965
 Chicago 11, 1966
 Acapulco Gpo, 1967
 Guns Along the Brazos, 1967
 Southern Daughter, 1967
 Live Again, Love Again, 1970
 Wild Girl, 1970

Collections

  This is Murder, Mr. Herbert, and Other Stories, 1948
  League of the Grateful Dead and Other Stories, 2010

References

External links
 "Becoming Day Keene: The Pre-Pulp Career of Gunard Hjertstedt" by Cullen Gallagher, at the Los Angeles Review of Books
 

1904 births
1969 deaths
20th-century American male writers
20th-century pseudonymous writers
American mystery writers
Novelists from Illinois
Pulp fiction writers
Writers from Chicago